Thomas Hayden (born July 14, 1978), aka Tommy Gun, is an American professional motorcycle racer and oldest brother to racers Nicky and Roger Lee.

Biography
Hayden was born and raised in Owensboro, Kentucky, where he currently resides.  His two younger brothers, Nicky and Roger Lee, are also  professional factory-backed motorcycle racers and his father, Earl, was a dirt track racer for twenty years.  Hayden's mother, Rose, also rode the Powder Puff class for five years.

Hayden turned pro in 1994 and is still a regular competitor in the Grand National Flat Track series during weekends when he is not road racing.  When away from the racetrack, he enjoys riding mountain bikes, motocross, supermoto, playing golf, and  jet skiing.

Hayden married his longtime girlfriend Christie Brown in November 2007 in Owensboro, KY.

Christie gave birth to Klaudia Rose Hayden on October 9, 2009 and Olivia July 17, 2003.

Racing history
He finished 6th in the 2006 AMA Superbike Championship.
In 2004, he won the first ever championship in the AMA Supersport class. 
In 2001, at the Springfield TT, the Hayden brothers took the first three positions: Nicky Hayden placed first, Tommy placed second, and Roger Lee Hayden finished third.
1998 AMA Superbike Rookie of the Year

Career statistics

AMA Pro Racing

 * Season still in progress

References

External links
 TommyHayden.com - Official site
 Tommy Hayden profile at AMAProRacing.com

1978 births
Living people
Sportspeople from Owensboro, Kentucky
American motorcycle racers
AMA Superbike Championship riders
AMA Grand National Championship riders